José Ramón is a Spanish given name. It may refer to:

José Ramón Basavilbaso (1764-1840), Argentine politician
José Ramón Rodil, 1st Marquess of Rodil (1789-1853), Spanish general
José Ramón Araneda (1887-?), Chilean politician
José Ramón Guizado (1899-1964), Panamanian politician
José Ramón Sauto (1912-1994), Mexican footballer
José Ramón Medina (1919-2010), Venezuelan politician and poet
José Ramón Fernández (1923-2019), Cuban politician
José Ramón Larraz (1929-2013), Spanish director
José Ramón Machado Ventura (born 1930), Cuban politician
José Ramón Herrero Merediz (1931-2016), Spanish politician
José Ramón Gurruchaga Ezama (1931-2017), Spanish bishop
José Ramón Balaguer Cabrera (born 1932), Cuban politician
José Ramón Díaz Alejandro (born 1943), Cuban artist
José Ramón Esnaola (born 1946), Spanish footballer
José Ramón Fernández (journalist) (born 1946), Mexican journalist
José Ramón Hinojosa Montalvo (born 1947), Spanish historian
José Ramón García Antón (1948-2009), Spanish politician
José Ramón López (born 1950), Spanish canoeist
José Ramón Carabante (born 1952), Spanish businessman
Jose Ramon Gonzalez Delgado (born 1953), Cuban artist
José Ramón Muro (born 1954), Spanish painter
José Ramón Martel López (born 1955), Mexican politician
José Ramón Alexanko (born 1956), Spanish footballer
José Ramón de la Morena (born 1956), Spanish journalist
José Ramón Oyarzábal (born 1957), Spanish rower
José Ramón Corchado (born 1957), Spanish footballer and manager
José Ramón Patterson (born 1958), Spanish journalist
José Ramón Gallego (born 1959), Spanish footballer
Jose Ramon Villarin (born 1960), Filipino priest
José Ramón Eizmendi (born 1960), Spanish footballer and manager
José Ramón Cossío (born 1960), Mexican jurist
José Ramón Romo (born 1963), Spanish footballer
José Ramón Uriarte (born 1967), Spanish cyclist
José Ramón (footballer, born 1968), Spanish footballer
José Ramón Sandoval (born 1968), Spanish footballer and manager
José Ramón Bauzà (born 1970), Spanish politician
José Ramón de la Fuente (born 1970), Spanish footballer
José Ramón Díaz (born 1973), Puerto Rican politician
José Ramón (footballer, born 1987), Spanish footballer
José Ramón Barreto (born 1991), Venezuelan entertainer
José Ramón Cantero Elvira (born 1993), Spanish swimmer
José Ramón Flórez, Spanish songwriter
José Ramón González, Puerto Rican businessman
José Ramón Rivero, Venezuelan politician
Jose Ramon de la Torre, Puerto Rican academic
José Ramon Argüello, Mexican mayor

See also:
Ciudad Deportiva José Ramón Cisneros Palacios, football stadium in Spain
José Ramón Cepero Stadium, football stadium in Cuba
Estadio Jose Ramon Flores, football stadium in El Salvador

Spanish masculine given names